Czarny Dunajec , is a town located in southern Poland near the Polish-Slovak border. Czarny Dunajec is in the Nowy Targ County (Polish: Powiat Nowotarski) and in the Lesser Poland. Czarny Dunajec is about 60 miles south of Kraków.

See also
Dunajec River
Nowy Targ
Zakopane

External links
Municipal Office
Elementary and Middle School (sometimes offline)
Jewish Community in Czarny Dunajec on Virtual Shtetl
Czarny Dunajec (outdated)

Villages in Nowy Targ County